Liolaemus janequeoae, Janequeo's lizard, is a species of lizard in the family Iguanidae.  It is found in Chile.

References

janequeoae
Lizards of South America
Reptiles of Chile
Endemic fauna of Chile
Reptiles described in 2016
Taxa named by Jaime Troncoso-Palacios
Taxa named by Hugo A. Díaz